Linnea Johansson (born 5 April 2002) is a Swedish ice hockey forward, currently playing with Linköping HC Dam in the Swedish Women's Hockey League (SDHL). She was a member of the Swedish junior national team during 2016 to 2020, and participated in the IIHF Women's World U18 Championship in 2018 and 2020.

Playing career   
Johansson grew up playing with boys, including Malmö Redhawks defenceman Helge Grans, at the Tre Kronors Hockeyskola in her native town of Ljungby. At the age of 14, she joined Karlskrona HK, playing with their women's team in the Damettan and in the club's junior system. The following season, she joined IF Troja-Ljungby and HV71 Dam, splitting her time between HV71 in the SDHL, IF Troja-Ljungby women's team in the Damettan, and IF Troja-Ljungby U16 in the U16 Elit. She made her SDHL debut in 2016–17, after being called up by HV71, getting two assists in seven games as well as playing in four playoff games. After putting up 7 points in 25 games with HV71 in 2017–18, and growing increasingly dissatisfied with the way girls were being treated in the mixed Troja-Ljungby junior teams, she left the city to sign with Linköping HC.

She scored 7 points in 19 games in her first year with Linköping before being sidelined due to a bad concussion suffered with the national U18 team. She would miss the first nine games of the 2019–20 SDHL season as well before returning to the ice.

International  
Johansson has represented Sweden at the 2018 and 2020 IIHF World Women's U18 Championships.

References

External links

2002 births
Living people
Linköping HC Dam players
HV71 Dam players
People from Ljungby Municipality
Karlskrona HK players
IF Troja/Ljungby players
Swedish women's ice hockey forwards
Olympic ice hockey players of Sweden
Ice hockey players at the 2022 Winter Olympics
Sportspeople from Kronoberg County